Avars (also Romanized as Ābres) is a village in Razliq Rural District, in the Central District of Sarab County, East Azerbaijan Province, Iran. At the 2006 census, its population was 318, in 70 families.

References 

Populated places in Sarab County